Telmatoblechnum indicum (many synonyms including Blechnum indicum) or the swamp water fern is often seen growing on sandy soils in swampy areas. The specific epithet indicum is from Latin, revealing this plant was first collected in the East Indies (Java). Indigenous Australians used the starchy rhizome as food.

This plant was collected with another swamp fern Cyclosorus interruptus by Joseph Banks and Daniel Solander at Botany Bay in 1770.

References

Blechnaceae
Ferns of Australasia
Ferns of Asia
Ferns of Australia
Flora of New South Wales
Flora of Queensland
Flora of Western Australia
Flora of the Northern Territory
Flora of Malesia
Bushfood
Plants described in 1768
Taxa named by Nicolaas Laurens Burman